E-mu SP-12 12 also known as the “sampling drum computer” was designed in 1985 and widely released in 1986 by E-mu Systems. Although the SP-12 was quickly superseded by the more powerful SP-1200, the SP-12 is often regarded as the first commercially successful drum machine and sampler combo.

History
The E-mu SP-12 was the spiritual successor to E-mu's Drumulator and was originally going to be produced under the name Drumulator II, however shortly before the sampler went into production its name was changed to SP-12. The name SP-12 stands for sampling percussion at twelve bits, demonstrating the power of the sampler.  The E-mu SP-12 is credited with helping usher in the era of digital sampling by being one of the first digital samplers in production, which allowed musicians to take digital sampling in a completely different direction. Originally the sole purpose of digital sampling was to allow producers to implement a desired sound into a keyboard so it would be able to be replicated within a song, however the SP-12 allowed the producer to focus primarily on the rhythm through the sampling and sequencing of the sounds of a drum something which was relatively rare at this point in time. The SP-12 would sample the desired drum sound, allowing you to augment it and then sequence the sampled drum sounds in any order that the producer would like to create the rhythmic backdrop for a song. Although this process was very innovative for the SP-12's true abilities were not E-mu's original intentions. DJ's of the 80's became famous for their ability to augment the sounds of old records to produce almost an entirely new composition through the use of a record player and this same principle was applied to the SP-12. People were beginning to replace the simple sampled drum sounds with the beats of their favorite drummers and even entire melodies, allowing their digital sampler to work just like the aforementioned set of turntables. These series of innovations left musicians with almost an endless amount of possibilities. Once E-mu systems realized the potential that the SP-12 had they quickly made the “Turbo” upgrade available which quadrupled the memory and doubled the sampling time. However the SP-12's existence was short lived for after only 2 years of production it was replaced by the far superior SP-1200. Today the SP-12 is more of an antique due to the superiority of the SP-1200, but it is still highly regarded as a collector's item.

Features 
The E-Mu SP-12 today is classified as lo-fi due to the fact that it samples at 12 bits at a rate of 26 kHz.  It came preloaded with 24 drum samples in ROM that consisted of a rim shot, four toms, electronic snare, snare, bass, four electronic toms, hi hats, crash, ride, claps, and cowbell along with eight user sample positions. The original SP-12 had a maximum sampling time of 1.2 seconds while with the Turbo upgrade it has a maximum sampling time of 5 seconds. The SP-12 has a 5000-note memory allowing it to store 100 songs and 100 patterns; with the turbo upgrade, this is increased to 400 songs and 400 patterns.

Trivia 
The SP-12 is almost identical in design to the E-mu Emulator II and many of the knobs and buttons are interchangeable.
Some of the original SP-12s have "Emulator SP12" written on them.
 Original SP-12's were known to have "Paul is the Walrus" and "Paul is dead" written on the motherboard.
 Later SP-12's Had "Loonie Tunes World Tour" written on the motherboards.
 The Beastie Boys reference the SP-12 in their song "Putting Shame In Your Game" from their 1998 album Hello Nasty with the line, "Well I'm the Benihana chef on the SP12." Rappin 4 Tay in Players Club (1994) says "I got a ho named reel-to-reel, she got a buddy named SP-12, now you know the deal." Young MC raps in the song Album Filler (1991) "It's just me, a mic, and an SP-12."
Big Grams, the collaboration between Big Boi and Phantogram references the SP-12 alongside other famous drum machines and sequencers such as the Roland TR-808 and Roland TR-909 in their song "Drum Machine" featuring Skrillex.

Notable Users 
Paul C
Prince Paul
Rick Rubin in Rhymin & Stealin on the Beastie Boys album Licensed to Ill

See also 
 Sampling (music)
 Music sequencer

References

External links 
 

Samplers (musical instrument)